The following highways are numbered 423:

Canada
Manitoba Provincial Road 423

Japan
 Japan National Route 423

United States
  Florida State Road 423
  County Road 423 (Florida)
  Louisiana Highway 423
  Maryland Route 423
  New Mexico State Road 423
  New York State Route 423
  Ohio State Route 423
  Pennsylvania Route 423
  Puerto Rico Highway 423
  Farm to Market Road 423